Tianzi may refer to:

 Tianzi Mountain, a mountain in Hunan, China
 Son of Heaven, a title of the Chinese sovereign, rulers of a particular period in ancient China
 Empress Tianzi, a character in the anime series Code Geass
 The Tianzi, a Daoist treatise by Tian Pian

See also
 Tenshi (disambiguation)